Floyd (Pork Chop) Seneca Womack (born November 15, 1978) is a former American football guard. He was drafted by the Seattle Seahawks in the fourth round of the 2001 NFL Draft. He played college football at Mississippi State.

He also played for the Cleveland Browns. Womack has played both right tackle and right guard in his career and saw time at both during the Browns' 2009 season.

References

1978 births
Living people
People from Cleveland, Mississippi
American football offensive tackles
American football offensive guards
Mississippi State Bulldogs football players
Seattle Seahawks players
Cleveland Browns players
Arizona Cardinals players
Players of American football from Mississippi
Ed Block Courage Award recipients